David Cameron Neylon is an advocate for open access and Professor of Research Communications at the Centre for Culture and Technology at Curtin University. From 2012 - 2015 they were the Advocacy Director at the Public Library of Science.

Education
Neylon was educated at the University of Western Australia and the Australian National University where they were awarded a Doctor of Philosophy degree in Biophysics in 1999 for work on directed molecular evolution and DNA-binding specificity.

Career
In 2009 Neylon was a senior scientist at the ISIS neutron source of the Science and Technology Facilities Council. From 2012 to 2015 they served as director of advocacy at the Public Library of Science. They joined The Centre for Culture and Technology (CCAT) at Curtin University in 2015 as Professor of Research Communications.

Neylon is an original drafter of the Panton Principles and opposed the Research Works Act and advocates for governmental encouragement for researchers to use open access licensing.

Neylon advocates for the use of altmetrics in determining the impact of scholarly publications.

Awards and honours
In 2010 they accepted a Blue Obelisk award.

References

External links 
 
 

Living people
Open access activists
PLOS people
Year of birth missing (living people)